Danny Dereck Prince (born 14 March 1986) is an Indian cricketer. He plays for Hyderabad. He made his Ranji Trophy debut for Hyderabad in 2007. However, after poor scores in the first match, he was sidelined. He continued to play in local leagues. In 2015, he was selected again for Hyderabad.

See also
 List of Hyderabad cricketers

References

External links
 

1986 births
Living people
Indian cricketers
Hyderabad cricketers
People from Nizamabad, Telangana